Cissa is a genus of relatively short-tailed magpies, sometimes known as hunting cissas, that reside in the forests of tropical and subtropical southeast Asia and adjacent regions. The four species are quite similar with bright red bills, a mainly green plumage, black mask, and rufous wings. Due to excess exposure to sunlight (and, possibly, a low-carotenoid diet), they often appear rather turquoise (instead of green) in captivity. They are carnivorous, and mainly feed on arthropods and small vertebrates.

The genus was introduced by the German zoologist Friedrich Boie in 1826 with the common green magpie (Cissa chinensis) as the type species. The name Cissa is from the Ancient Greek kissa meaning a "jay" or "magpie".

The genus  Cissa contains four species:

References

 
Bird genera
Taxa named by Friedrich Boie